The 1967 Prague Skate was a senior international figure skating competition held in November 1967 in Czechoslovakia. Medals were awarded in the disciplines of men's singles, ladies' singles, pair skating, and ice dancing. Ondrej Nepela and Hana Mašková won gold medals for Czechoslovakia in the singles categories. The Soviet Union won two titles — Tatiana Sharanova / Anatoli Evdokimov took gold in pairs while Irina Grishkova / Viktor Ryzhkin became the ice dancing champions.

Men

Ladies

Pairs

Ice dancing

References

Prague Skate
Prague Skate